Augustine Ohilebo is an Anglican bishop in Nigeria.

Ohilebo is the current Bishop of Sabongidda-Ora: he was consecrated in August, 2017 at St. John's Anglican Cathedral, Bendel. He was educated at Ambrose Alli University and ordained in 2004.

Notes

Living people
Anglican bishops of Sabongidda-Ora
21st-century Anglican bishops in Nigeria
Year of birth missing (living people)
Ambrose Alli University alumni